This is a list of the Spanish Singles number-one hits of 1960.

Chart history

See also
1960 in music
List of number-one hits (Spain)

References

1960
Spain Singles
Number-one singles